The Legend of the Condor Heroes, also released as Legend of Eagle Shooting Hero and Legend of the Arching Hero, is a Chinese television series adapted from Louis Cha's novel The Legend of the Condor Heroes. It is the first instalment of a trilogy produced by Zhang Jizhong, followed by The Return of the Condor Heroes (2006) and  The Heaven Sword and Dragon Saber (2009). It was first broadcast on CCTV in China in 2003.

Cast
 Li Yapeng as Guo Jing 
 Wang Meng as young Guo Jing
 Zhou Xun as Huang Rong
 Zhou Jie as Yang Kang
 Jiang Qinqin as Mu Nianci
 Ding Haifeng as Yang Tiexin
 Zhao Liang as Zhou Botong
 Sun Haiying as Hong Qigong
 Cao Peichang as Huang Yaoshi
 You Yong as Ouyang Feng
 Wang Weiguo as Yideng
 Zhang Jizhong as Wang Chongyang
 Li Feng as Guo Xiaotian
 He Qing as Bao Xiruo
 Lü Liping as Li Ping
 Bao Dazhi as Wanyan Honglie
 Zhang Xiaojun as Chen Xuanfeng
 Yang Liping as Mei Chaofeng
 Liu Liwei as Ke Zhen'e
 Yu Youchuan as Zhu Cong
 Ba Te'er as Han Baoju
 Yang Guanghua as Nan Xiren
 Xie Ning as Zhang A'sheng
 Wang Wei as Quan Jinfa
 Zhao Feng as Han Xiaoying
 Ba Sen as Temüjin (Genghis Khan)
 Ba Yin as Jebe
 A'Siru as Huazheng
 Yuan Yundi as young Huazheng
 Ma Liping as Jochi
 Bate as Ögodei
 Siqinbilige as Tolui
 Meng Meng as young Tolui
 Zhou Haodong as Qiu Chuji
 Wang Gang as Wang Chuyi
 Li Xiaomin as Ma Yu
 Li Wei as Yin Zhiping
 Xiu Qing as Ouyang Ke 
 Zhang Hengping as Lu Youjiao
 Li Yu as Qiu Qianren
 Wulan Baoyin as Lu Chengfeng
 Ren Yuanyuan as Cheng Yaojia
 Huang Chong as Lu Guanying
 Liu Kui as Duan Tiande
 Yang Niansheng as Liang Ziweng
 Wang Wensheng as Hou Tonghai
 Li Yihua as Sha Tongtian 
 Cui Yong as Peng Lianhu
 Tong Ruimin as Wanyan Hongxi
 Huang Xiaolei as Shagu
 Liang Li as Yinggu
 Yu Min
 Kuk Kwok-leung

List of featured songs
 Tiandi Douzai Wo Xinzhong (天地都在我心中; Heaven and Earth in My Heart) performed by Qiu Ye
 Zhenqing Zhenmei (真情真美; True Love Is Beautiful) performed by Sun Nan and Valen Hsu
 Shangbieli (伤别离; The Pain of Separation) performed by Cao Hai
 Niyuwo Gonghao (你与我共好; You and I Are Well) performed by Anita Mui
 Jiandao Ni Zai Buhui Wang (见到你再不会忘; Will Not Forget You When I See You Again) performed by Li Yapeng and Zhou Xun

Production
Shooting locations include Inner Mongolia, Zhejiang and Red Hill Park.

International broadcast
It aired in Thailand on Channel 3 in late 2004, dubbed as Mungkorn Yok. ("มังกรหยก", literally: Jade Dragon).

References

External links
 
  The Legend of the Condor Heroes on Sina.com
  The Legend of the Condor Heroes official page on Ciwen Pictures' website

2003 Chinese television series debuts
2003 Chinese television series endings
2010 Taiwanese television series debuts
2010 Taiwanese television series endings
Television shows based on The Legend of the Condor Heroes
Television series set in the Southern Song
Television series set in the Jin dynasty (1115–1234)
Television series set in the Mongol Empire
Chinese wuxia television series
Depictions of Genghis Khan on television
Television shows set in Hangzhou
Mandarin-language television shows
Television series by Ciwen Media